Sueliton is a name. Notable people with the name include:

Given name
 Sueliton (footballer, born 1986), full name Sueliton Pereira de Aguiar, Brazilian football right-back
 Suéliton (footballer, born 1991), full name Suéliton Florencio Nogueira, Brazilian football centre-back

See also
 Suelton (born 1991), full name Suelton Marques de Souza, Brazilian futsal player